Anzhela Nadtochayeva is a Soviet sprint canoer who competed in the late 1980s. She won a silver medal in the K-4 500 m event at the 1986 ICF Canoe Sprint World Championships in Montreal.

References

Living people
Soviet female canoeists
Year of birth missing (living people)
Russian female canoeists
ICF Canoe Sprint World Championships medalists in kayak